Bouquet with Flying Lovers is a painting by Marc Chagall. The work is oil on canvas.

According to Chagall himself, he started working on the painting in the 1930s when he lived in Paris, and he finished the work when he was mourning the death of his wife Bella. The image is predominantly blue and shows a bouquet of flowers in the center. Above the flowers, two lovers float in the air. An angel enters through the window. The buildings on the right side depict Vitebsk, Chagall's birth village.

References

Paintings by Marc Chagall
1963 paintings
Angels in art